Marietta National Cemetery is a United States National Cemetery located in the city of Marietta in Cobb County, Georgia. It encompasses , and as of the end of 2006, had 18,742 interments. It is closed to new interments, and is now maintained by the new Georgia National Cemetery.

History 
Originally established in 1866 by General George Henry Thomas as Marietta and Atlanta National Cemetery, it was intended to provide interment for nearly 10,000 Union dead from General William Tecumseh Sherman’s Atlanta Campaign.

The land for the cemetery was donated by local resident Henry Cole, as a place to inter both Union and Confederate soldiers. His idea was that by burying together those who had fallen together in battle, it could help foster a kind of peace. Both sides rejected his proposal, and the land was used primarily to inter Union soldiers, while the others were buried in the Marietta Confederate Cemetery. As part of the land sale agreement, the Cole family has their own plot within the National Cemetery.

Marietta National Cemetery was placed on the National Register of Historic Places on September 18, 1998.

Notable monuments 
 A marble obelisk dedicated in honor of 20th Army Corps was erected in May 1870.
 The Wisconsin Monument, dedicated in 1925 to 405 men from Wisconsin who died during the Civil War and were interred at the cemetery.
 The Gold Star Mothers Monument, dedicated on April 24, 1960.
 The Pearl Harbor Monument, erected on December 7, 1996.

Notable interments and monuments 
 Medal of Honor recipients
 Corporal Lee Hugh Phillips (1930–1950), for action in the Korean War (cenotaph)
 Private Denis Buckley (1844–1864), for capture of flag of the 31st Mississippi (CSA) in the Civil War
 Others
 John Clark (1766–1832), American Revolutionary War veteran, US Congressman, Georgia governor
 General W. A. Cunningham (1886–1968), US Army Colonel and University of Georgia Head Coach, Football
 Frank Simmons Leavitt, a.k.a. Man Mountain Dean (1891–1953), Master Sergeant in World War I and World War II, and professional wrestler
 Ella Lillian Wall Van Leer (1892–1986), Artist, architect, women's rights activist, and known as First Lady of Georgia Tech
 Emma Stephenson, Nurse at Union hospital in Civil War. Freed African-American Slave.

References

External links

 National Cemetery Administration
 Marietta National Cemetery
 Interments at Marietta National Cemetery
 
 
 

1866 establishments in Georgia (U.S. state)
Buildings and structures in Marietta, Georgia
Cemeteries in Georgia (U.S. state)
Cemeteries on the National Register of Historic Places in Georgia (U.S. state)
Colonial Revival architecture in Georgia (U.S. state)
Historic American Landscapes Survey in Georgia (U.S. state)
National Register of Historic Places in Cobb County, Georgia
Protected areas of Cobb County, Georgia
United States national cemeteries